Tamale Central is one of the constituencies represented in the Parliament of Ghana. It elects one Member of Parliament (MP) by the first past the post system of election. Tamale Central is located in the Tamale Metropolitan district  of the Northern Region of Ghana.

This seat was created prior to the  Ghanaian parliamentary election in 2004.

At the by-election held on 4 April 2006, Alhassan Fuseini Inusah of the National Democratic Congress (NDC) won with a majority of 17502. This followed the resignation of Alhassan Wayo Seini (NDC), who resigned to join the New Patriotic Party but lost the resultant by-election.

Boundaries
The seat is located within the Tamale Municipal district of the Northern Region of Ghana.

Members of Parliament

Elections

 
 
 
 
 
 
 
 

Though Alhassan Wayo Seini had left the NDC to join the New Patriotic Party, he stood for the by-election as an independent candidate.

See also
List of Ghana Parliament constituencies

References 

Parliamentary constituencies in the Northern Region (Ghana)
2004 establishments in Ghana